Paphos International Airport  is a joint civil-military public airport located  southeast of the city of Paphos, Cyprus. It is the country's second largest airport, after Larnaca International Airport.

History
The airport first opened in 1982. In May 2006, Hermes Airports Limited took over the construction, development and operation of both Larnaca and Paphos airports for a period of 25 years. According to the airport operator, Paphos Airport served 1,744,011 passengers in 2007. A new terminal opened at Paphos in November 2008.

On 10 January 2012, Ryanair announced they were to open their 50th base in Paphos. In April 2012, they placed 2 aircraft in Paphos with 15 new routes, offering over 80 flights a week. Ryanair claim the reason they opened the base in Paphos was due to reduced landing charges offered by Hermes' incentive scheme, as well as the fact that they can easily operate within their standards (e.g. their typical 25 minutes turnaround time).

A new four-lane road is being planned to link the airport and Paphos so passengers and staff can avoid using the B6 Main road and the E603 secondary road which are often heavily congested.

Facilities

Passenger facilities include 28 check-in desks, 1 special baggage check-in, 7 gates, 22 aircraft stands, a bank, restaurants, cafeterias, bars, a duty-free shop and a gift shop. Other facilities include a tourist help desk, car rental, first aid, a baby/parent room and disabled access facilities. Refrigerated storage, health officials, and X-ray equipment are among some of the facilities provided for cargo. Furthermore, loading platforms and forklifts are also available.

Andreas Papandreou Air Base
The airport is also an asset of the Cyprus National Guard, serving as a military air force base under the call name "Andreas Papandreou". It is considered the most south-eastern European Air Force base component of various EU air forces, as well as a safe base for humanitarian and emergency purposes for other countries.

Airlines and destinations

The following airlines operate regular scheduled and charter flights to and from Paphos:

Statistics

Access

Bus 
There is a regular bus service from Paphos Harbour station to the airport, limited services also run to/from Paphos Town (Karavella) and Polis. Direct buses to/from Limassol, Nicosia and Larnaca are also available.

Car 
The airport is located 20.8 km southeast of Paphos and 61.2 km west of Limassol.

Accidents and incidents
 On 21 September 2011, a Thomson Airways Boeing 737-800 inadvertently landed on the taxiway parallel to the runway (Taxiway Bravo, formerly Runway 11L/29R). No other aircraft was on the taxiway at the time, and the Thomson taxied safely to the apron. A NOTAM was published on 20 December 2011, warning pilots of the possibility of mistaking the runway with the parallel taxiway. An additional NOTAM was published on 14 August 2012, recommending pilots to confirm their alignment with the runway by using the ILS localizer when performing a visual approach to runway 29. By 2014, yellow "TAXI" markings were painted across the width of the parallel taxiway near either longitudinal end, facing approaching aircraft; and a "TAXIWAY" marking was painted at its junction with Taxiway Charlie (about midway), facing the latter.

References

External links

Official website

Airports in Cyprus
Paphos